Atanasio is a masculine given name which may refer to:

Atanasiu di Iaci (Atanasio in Italian), 13th century Italian Benedictine monk and historiographer
Atanasio Aguirre, President of Uruguay from 1864 to 1865
Atanasio Bello Montero (1800–1876), Venezuelan musician
Atanasio Bimbacci (c. 1654–1734), Italian painter of the Baroque period
Atanasio Amisse Canira (born 1962), Mozambican Roman Catholic Bishop of Lichinga
Atanasio Echeverría y Godoy, late 18th-century Mexican botanical artist and naturalist
Atanasio Girardot (1791–1813), Colombian revolutionary leader
Atanasio Ndongo Miyone (died 1969), musician from Equatorial Guinea, lyrics writer of the national anthem
Atanasio Monserrate, Indian politician

Italian masculine given names
Masculine given names
Spanish masculine given names